A flood myth or a deluge myth is a myth in which a great flood, usually sent by a deity or deities, destroys civilization, often in an act of divine retribution. Parallels are often drawn between the flood waters of these myths and the primaeval waters which appear in certain creation myths, as the flood waters are described as a measure for the cleansing of humanity, in preparation for rebirth. Most flood myths also contain a culture hero, who "represents the human craving for life".

The flood-myth motif occurs in many cultures, including the Mesopotamian flood stories, Native American in North America, the Genesis flood narrative, manvantara-sandhya in Hinduism, and Deucalion and Pyrrha in Greek mythology.

Mythologies
One example of a flood myth is the Epic of Gilgamesh. Many scholars believe that this account was copied from the  Akkadian Atra-Hasis, which dates to the 18th century BCE. In the Gilgamesh flood myth, the highest god, Enlil, decides to destroy the world with a flood because humans have become too noisy. The god Ea, who had created humans out of clay and divine blood, secretly warns the hero Utnapishtim of the impending flood and gives him detailed instructions for building a boat so that life may survive. Both the Epic of Gilgamesh and Atra-Hasis are preceded by the similar Sumerian creation myth (c. 1600 BCE)—the oldest surviving example of such a flood-myth narrative, known from tablets found in the ruins of Nippur in the late 1890s and translated by assyriologist Arno Poebel.

Yi Samuel Chen analyzed various texts from the Early Dynastic III Period through to the Old Babylonian Period, and argues that the flood narrative was only added in texts written during the Old Babylonian Period. With regard to the Sumerian King List, observations by experts have always indicated that the portion of the Sumerian King List talking about before the flood differs stylistically  from the King List Proper. Essentially Old Babylonian copies tend to represent a tradition of before the flood apart from the actual King List, whereas the Ur III copy of the King List and the duplicate from the Brockmon collection indicate that the King List Proper once existed independent of mention of the flood and the tradition of before the flood. Essentially, Chen gives evidence to prove that the section of before the flood and references to the flood in the Sumerian King List were all later additions added in during the Old Babylonian Period, as the Sumerian King List went through updates and edits. The flood as a watershed in early history of the world was probably a new historiographical concept emerging in the Mesopotamian literary traditions during the Old Babylonian Period, as evident by the fact that the flood motif didn't show up in the Ur III copy and that earliest chronographical sources related to the flood show up in the Old Babylonian Period. Chen also concludes that the name of "Ziusudra" as a flood hero and the idea of the flood hinted at by that name in the Old Babylonian Version of "Instructions of Shuruppak" are only developments during that Old Babylonian Period, when also the didactic text was updated with information from the burgeoning Antediluvian Tradition.

In Hindu mythology, texts such as the Satapatha Brahmana ( 6th century BCE) and the Puranas contain the story of a great flood, "manvantara-sandhya", wherein the Matsya Avatar of the Vishnu warns the first man,  Manu, of the impending flood, and also advises him to build a giant boat. In Zoroastrian Mazdaism, Ahriman tries to destroy the world with a drought, which Mithra ends by shooting an arrow into a rock, from which a flood springs; one man survives in an ark with his cattle. Norbert Oettinger argues that the story of  Yima and the Vara was originally a flood myth, and the harsh winter was added in due to the dry nature of Eastern Iran, as flood myths didn't have as much of an effect as harsh winters. He has argued that the mention of melted water flowing in  Videvdad 2.24 is a remnant of the flood myth, and mentions that the Indian flood myths originally had their protagonist as Yama, but it was changed to Manu later.

In Plato's  Timaeus, written  360 BCE,  Timaeus describes a flood myth similar to the earlier versions. In it, the  Bronze race of humans angers the high god Zeus with their constant warring. Zeus decides to punish humanity with a flood. The Titan Prometheus, who had created humans from clay, tells the secret plan to Deucalion, advising him to build an ark in order to be saved. After nine nights and days, the water starts receding and the ark lands on a mountain.

The Cheyenne, a North American Great Plains tribe, believe in a flood which altered the course of their history, perhaps occurring in the Missouri River Valley.

Historicity 
Floods in the wake of the Last Glacial Period (c. 115,000 – c. 11,700 years ago) are speculated to have inspired myths that survive to this day. Plato's allegory of Atlantis is set over 9,000 years before his time, leading some scholars to suggest that a Stone Age society which lived close to the Mediterranean Sea could have been wiped out by the rising sea level, an event which could have served as the basis for the story.

Archaeologist Bruce Masse stated that some of the narratives of a Great Flood discovered in many cultures around the world may be linked to an oceanic asteroid impact that occurred between Africa and Antarctica, around the time of a solar eclipse, that caused a tsunami.  His hypothesis suggests that a meteor or comet crashed into the Indian Ocean around 3000–2800 BCE on May 10, which created the  undersea Burckle Crater and Fenambosy Chevron, and generated a giant tsunami that flooded coastal lands.

Mesopotamia

Mesopotamia, like other early sites of riverine civilisation, was flood-prone; and for those experiencing valley-wide inundations, flooding could destroy the whole of their known world. According to the excavation report of the 1930s excavation at Shuruppak (modern Tell Fara, Iraq), the Jemdet Nasr and Early Dynastic layers at the site were separated by a layer of sand and silt that was interpreted as a flood layer. However, more recently it has been suggested that the nature of this deposit is more like that being created by river avulsion, a process that was very common in the Tigris–Euphrates river system. Similar layers have been recorded at other sites as well, all dating to different periods, which would be consistent with the nature of river avulsions.

The geography of the Mesopotamian area changed considerably with the filling of the Persian Gulf after sea waters rose following the last glacial period. A sudden increase in settlements above the present-day water level is recorded at around 7,500 BP.

Mediterranean Basin
Historian Adrienne Mayor theorizes that global flood stories may have been inspired by ancient observations of seashells and fish fossils in inland and mountain areas. The ancient Greeks, Egyptians, and Romans all documented the discovery of such remains in such locations; the Greeks hypothesized that Earth had been covered by water on several occasions, citing the seashells and fish fossils found on mountain tops as evidence of this idea.

Speculation regarding the Deucalion myth has postulated a large tsunami in the Mediterranean Sea, caused by the Thera eruption (with an approximate geological date of 1630–1600 BCE), as the myth's historical basis. Although the tsunami hit the South Aegean Sea and Crete, it did not affect cities in the mainland of Greece, such as Mycenae, Athens, and Thebes, which continued to prosper, indicating that it had a local rather than a region-wide effect.

Black Sea deluge hypothesis
The Black Sea deluge hypothesis offers a controversial account of long-term flooding; the hypothesis argues for a catastrophic irruption of water about 5600 BCE from the Mediterranean Sea into the Black Sea basin. This has become the subject of considerable discussion. The Younger Dryas impact hypothesis offers another proposed natural explanation for flood myths; this idea is similarly controversial.

Comets 

The earliest known hypothesis about a comet that had a widespread effect on human populations can be attributed to Edmond Halley, who in 1694 suggested that a worldwide flood had been the result of a near-miss by a comet. The issue was taken up in more detail by William Whiston, a protégé of and popularizer of the theories of Isaac Newton, who argued in his book A New Theory of the Earth (1696) that a comet encounter was the probable cause of the Biblical Flood of Noah in 2342 BCE. Whiston also attributed the origins of the atmosphere and other significant changes in the Earth to the effects of comets.

In Pierre-Simon Laplace's book Exposition Du Systême Du Monde (The System of the World), first published in 1796, he stated:

A similar hypothesis was popularized by Minnesota congressman and pseudoarchaeology writer Ignatius L. Donnelly in his book Ragnarok: The Age of Fire and Gravel (1883), which followed his better-known book Atlantis: The Antediluvian World (1882). In Ragnarok, Donnelly argued that an enormous comet struck the Earth around 6,000 BCE to 9,000 BCE, destroying an advanced civilization on the "lost continent" of Atlantis. Donnelly, following others before him, attributed the Biblical Flood to this event, which he hypothesized had also resulted in catastrophic fires and climate change. Shortly after the publication of Ragnarok, one commenter noted, "Whiston ascertained that the deluge of Noah came from a comet's tail; but Donnelly has outdone Whiston, for he has shown that our planet has suffered not only from a cometary flood, but from cometary fire, and a cometary rain of stones."

Art

See also

List of flood myths

References
Footnotes

Citations

Sources

Further reading
 Bailey, Lloyd R. Noah, the Person and the Story, University of South Carolina Press, 1989. 
 Best, Robert M. Noah's Ark and the Ziusudra Epic, Sumerian Origins of the Flood Myth, 1999, 
 Dundes, Alan (ed.) The Flood Myth, University of California Press, Berkeley, 1988. 
 Faulkes, Anthony (trans.) Edda (Snorri Sturluson). Everyman's Library, 1987. 
 Greenway, John (ed.), The Primitive Reader, Folkways, 1965. 
 Grey, G. Polynesian Mythology. Whitcombe and Tombs, Christchurch, 1956. 
 Lambert, W. G. and Millard, A. R., Atra-hasis: The Babylonian Story of the Flood, Eisenbrauns, 1999. 
 Masse, W. B. "The Archaeology and Anthropology of Quaternary Period Cosmic Impact", in Bobrowsky, P., and Rickman, H. (eds.) Comet/Asteroid Impacts and Human Society: An Interdisciplinary Approach Berlin, Springer Press, 2007. pp. 25–70. 
 Reed, A. W. Treasury of Maori Folklore A.H. & A.W. Reed, Wellington, 1963. 
 Reedy, Anaru (trans.), Nga Korero a Pita Kapiti: The Teachings of Pita Kapiti. Canterbury University Press, Christchurch, 1997. 
Like many other folk-tale elements from around the world, the story of flood survival and human restart (motif A 1021.0.2 and associated elements) appears in Stith Thompson's Motif-Index of Folk-Literature.

 
Catastrophism
Comparative mythology
Megafloods
Mesopotamian myths
Jemdet Nasr period